Conasprella ericmonnieri is a species of sea snail, a marine gastropod mollusc in the family Conidae, the cone snails, cone shells or cones.

Description
The size of the shell attains 35 mm.

Distribution
This species occurs in the Caribbean Sea.

References

 Petuch E.J. & Myers R.F. (2014) New species of Conidae and Conilithidae (Gastropoda: Conoidea) from the Bahamas, eastern Caribbean, and Brazil. Xenophora Taxonomy 3: 26–46.
  Puillandre N., Duda T.F., Meyer C., Olivera B.M. & Bouchet P. (2015). One, four or 100 genera? A new classification of the cone snails. Journal of Molluscan Studies. 81: 1-23

External links
 To World Register of Marine Species
 Gastropods.com: Jaspidiconus ericmonnieri

ericmonnieri
Gastropods described in 2014